The University of Toronto Mississauga (UTM), also known as U of T Mississauga, is one of the three campuses that make up the tri-campus system of the University of Toronto. Located in Mississauga, Ontario, Canada, the campus opened in 1967 as Erindale College, set upon the valley of the Credit River, approximately 33 km west of Downtown Toronto. It is the second-largest of the three University of Toronto campuses, the other two of which are the St. George campus in Downtown Toronto and the Scarborough campus in Scarborough, Ontario.

History
The site of the Mississauga campus is the former estate of Reginald Watkins, which was acquired by the University of Toronto in 1963. Founded as Erindale College in 1965, construction of the University's main building began in 1966. Although this building was originally meant to be temporary, the building remained until 2016 as part of the North Building. In 1998, Erindale College was rebranded as University of Toronto Mississauga.

In 2007, UTM celebrated its 40th anniversary, a milestone which was capped off with the grand opening of the Hazel McCallion Academic Learning Centre on June 2, 2007.

In 2017, UTM celebrated its 50th anniversary, a milestone that coincided with Canada's sesquicentennial.

Campus

The campus consists of a number of buildings arranged across a large, treed lot. The surrounding suburban neighbourhood (the Mississauga Road area and the Credit Woodlands) is a fairly affluent section of the city of Mississauga. The largest building was built as a megalithic structure, predominantly out of concrete, as was typical of the brutalist architecture style of the late 1960s. It was one of architect Raymond Moriyama's first major commissions. Other buildings were added over the decades, and with the enlarged enrollment at the beginning of the new millennium, the pace of construction increased.

In September 2014, UTM opened Deerfield Hall, the first phase of the two-phase reconstruction of the North Building. It features four storeys with theatre rehearsal space, computer labs, classrooms, offices, formal and informal study space and an expanded food services area. The North Building Phase B, later named Maanjiwe nendamowinan—a 220,595-square-foot, six-storey structure—opened in September 2018. The LEED-certified project cost approximately $89 million. 
The Mississaugas of the Credit First Nation (MCFN) on whose traditional territory the campus now stands, recommended Maanjiwe nendamowinan (pronounced Mahn-ji-way nen-da-mow-in-ahn), a formally endorsed Anishinaabemowin name meaning “gathering of minds.”

A new CCT (formerly CCIT) building, designed by Saucier + Perrot, was opened in September 2004. It is characterized by a black and glass exterior. The interior is finished in concrete and gray paint, with black plastic melamine on many surfaces. The new library and academic learning centre, designed by Shore Tilbe Irwin + Partners and named after Mississauga's mayor, Hazel McCallion, opened October 8, 2006, and the new Recreation, Athletics and Wellness Centre, also by Shore Tilbe, opened less than a month previous to that. The new library consists of four floors with a mixture of group study tables and individual silent study space.

The Mississauga Academy of Medicine, which opened in August 2011 with 54 first-year students, is a partnership between UTM, the University of Toronto Faculty of Medicine, and the three hospitals of the Trillium Health Partners system. The new facility is located across two floors inside the new Terrence Donnelly Health Sciences Complex and provides brand new classrooms, seminar rooms, computer facilities, learning spaces and laboratories. Students are provided with fully equipped student lounge and outdoor terrace to relax and socialize. Students are able to share lectures and learning experiences both inside and outside the classroom through advanced technologies.

In 2013, $1 million dollars was spent on constructing a large stone monument at the entrance way to the campus, along with general repairs to nearby sidewalks, pedestrian crossings, lighting, and electrical equipment. The stone monument became the centre of a controversy, with an almost universally negative reaction from students due to what was seen as excessive expenditure and lack of student involvement in the approval process, though the university said that a student was on the committee that approved the project.

Academics

U of T Mississauga campus offers 155 programs, among 95 areas of study. Its most popular programs include Anthropology, Biology, Chemistry, Commerce, CCIT (Communications, Culture Information and Technology), Computer Science, Criminology & Socio-Legal Studies, Earth Science, English, Environmental Studies, History, Management, Philosophy, Psychology, and Sociology.

There are also joint-degree programs with Sheridan College in CCIT, Art and Art History, or Theatre and Drama, leading to both a university degree from U of T and a college diploma from Sheridan. The CCIT Major and Digital Enterprise Management Specialist programs allow students the opportunity to earn Honours Bachelor of Arts degrees from the University of Toronto, as well as a Certificate in Digital Communications from Sheridan College.

Other undergraduate programs offered at U of T Mississauga include Professional Writing and Communication, Economics, Mathematics, Chemistry, Languages, Physics, Environmental Sciences, Geography, and Earth Sciences (ex. Geology).

U of T Mississauga also hosts one of the few palaeomagnetism laboratories in Canada. This lab investigated the palaeomagnetic properties of rocks collected from the Apollo missions in the 1970s and was run by now professor emeritus Dr. Henry Halls. U of T Mississauga's best-known president was Dr. J. Tuzo Wilson, a geologist and pioneer in plate tectonics. A research wing in the William G. Davis building of U of T Mississauga is named after him.

Student life

The campus is home to CFRE-FM, broadcasting twenty-four hours a day at 91.9FM out of the Student Centre. With a focus on Canadian and independent music, students and community members are encouraged to apply for a show, as no experience is required. There is also a student newspaper, The Medium.

The main practice facility of the Toronto Argonauts football club was located on campus until 2014.

Students who contribute much to student life are recognized through various awards including the Gordon Cressy Student Leadership Award and the UTM Principal's Student Involvement Award.

The University of Toronto Mississauga has many spaces for students to study and socialize. Students can spend time at The Student Centre, the Library's Starbucks cafe, Davis Building's Meeting Place, Oscar Peterson Residence's Colman Commons Dining Hall, CCT's Circuit Cafe, Instructional Centre's dining and lounge area, and others.

The UTM student centre offers a variety of events and programs available to students and is located on the UTM campus. Events offered to students include movie nights held every Monday evening, occasional guest speakers, and a variety of other events run by the student centre. The student centre also houses other student organizations including the UTM student newspaper, campus radio station, the UTM Student Union, and numerous other student clubs.

The Blind Duck Pub, located in The Student Centre, is popular eating spot on campus where students and staff are able to socialize. The menu includes chicken wings, halal meats, vegetarian dishes, French fries and more. The Blind Duck Pub also hosts many student events including the First Pub, Last Pub, and Halloween Pub where various artists such as Shawn Desman and Mia Martina perform. Students can find on-campus employment opportunities at the Blind Duck Pub as it is owned and operated by the UTM Student Union.

Athletics

The Recreation Athletic and Wellness Centre (RAWC), attached to the Davis Building, expanded the Campus Rec Intramural Program in 2006–07. The RAWC supplies sports equipment for drop-ins with a student card or membership. These sports include basketball, soccer, volleyball, table tennis, and racquet sports. In addition to these sports, the Centre offers organized classes in dance, martial arts, yoga, and swimming. There are two gymnasiums, one North American-sized squash court, two international-sized squash courts, one pool with a whirlpool on deck, and a fitness and training centre, among other studios and multipurpose rooms. There are varsity sports teams in outdoor soccer, indoor soccer, basketball, lacrosse, ice hockey, field hockey, volleyball, flag football, ultimate frisbee and rugby. In addition there is a Tri-Campus Intramural Leagues in which students from all three campuses are welcomed to try out for these competitive teams. These teams include men's ice hockey, men's outdoor soccer, men's indoor soccer, women's basketball, women's indoor soccer, and women's volleyball.

Varsity Sports (UTM Eagles)
UTM became the 30th member of the Ontario College Athletics Association (OCAA) in April, 2014. The Eagles inaugural Varsity athletics program included badminton, cross country, and men's and women's indoor soccer. The UTM Varsity Eagles program is looking to expand in 2015/16 by adding men's and women's outdoor soccer, and men's and women's volleyball and basketball in 2017/18.

Residence
The University of Toronto Mississauga houses over 1600 students in residence. Undergraduate residence includes Oscar Peterson Hall (OPH), McLuhan Court, Putnam Place, Leacock Lane, Roy Ivor Hall, Erindale Hall, MaGrath Valley, and Schreiberwood. First-year residence includes OPH, McLuhan Court, Roy Ivor Hall, Erindale Hall, MaGrath Valley, and Schreiberwood. Upper-year housing includes Putnam Place and Leacock Lane. OPH is a traditional-style residence with single rooms and shared bathrooms. Townhouse-style residences on campus offer a townhouse with four single rooms, one bathroom, a living room and a kitchen per house.  Roy Ivor Hall and Erindale Hall are first-year apartment suites with four bedrooms, two bathrooms, a living room and kitchen per suite. Each bedroom in Erindale hall is a double bedroom while each bedroom in Roy Ivor hall is a single bedroom. The Colman Commons located in OPH is the main dining facility for students living on residence. Putnam Place and Leacock Lane are townhouse-style residences. Each residence is fully equipped with laundry machines and common lounges.

Theatre 

The Erindale Studio Theatre is a black box theatre with an audience capacity of up to 85, depending on the stage configuration. The building itself was formerly a bus garage and science lab, but was converted into a theatre in 1993. It has a modern lighting and audio system, as well as a full carpentry shop, costume shop, box office and painting facilities.

Theatre Erindale is a theatre production company at UTM for students in the joint Theatre and Drama Studies program with Sheridan College. The company presents a season of 5 plays in the Erindale Studio Theatre. These plays include classics, modern pieces and a yearly collective developed by the third year class.  Several shows have been included in the Ontario Arts Review Top 10 List since 2005. The season's shows are also supported by students of the Technical Production program at Sheridan College who do placements in stage management, lighting operation, and sound operation.

The Multimedia Studio Theatre (MiST) is a modern, flexible theatre space used as a venue for drama lectures, performances by touring companies, independent student productions, Theatre Erindale's annual Beck Festival of student-directed performances, and the UTM Drama Club's annual production. The Blackwood Gallery on campus has used MiST on several occasions for receptions, conferences, and art exhibits. The theatre is contained in the CCT building designed by Saucier + Perrotte Architectes.

Blackwood Art Gallery 
Mississauga's first public art gallery was established on campus in 1969 as the Erindale College Art Gallery. It was renamed in 1992 as The Blackwood Gallery in honour of Canadian artist David Blackwood who was artist-in-residence at UTM from 1967 to 1971. The gallery collects, maintains, preserves, and exhibits over 450 works of UTM's permanent collection, and exhibits student work from the Art & Art History Program at Sheridan College and UTM.

UTM Students' Union 
The University of Toronto Mississauga Students' Union (UTMSU) represents the interests of the undergraduate students at UTM through various clubs and events. A wide variety of clubs exist to represent different religions and cultures. Students are welcomed by meeting other students who share the same values and beliefs as they do. The Arab Students for Peace and World Change, Christian Unity Association, Erindale College of African Student Association and Chinese Students and Scholars Association (UTMCSSA), are just a few of the 86 clubs that UTM offers to students. The UTMSU also offers many clubs that represent student hobbies such as Music Club, Drama Club, Anime Club, Cricket Club, Cycling Club and many more.

At UTM, almost every academic department has an academic society.  These societies are student-led organizations that focus on a specific program that the campus offers. Students are able to work with others who are enrolled in the same program where they can discuss and participate in a variety of academic goals.

Prior to the incoming school year, the UTM student union organizes frosh week, an event held annually aimed at welcoming first year students into the University. Hosting approximately 1,200 students every year, UTM frosh week offers a variety of events and activities meant to introduce students into University life and allow first year students to meet other incoming students.  Frosh week events are held both on and off the UTM campus. Featured at the 2011 frosh week Shawn Desman performed for students at The Blind Duck.  Other frosh week activities included off campus visits to Medieval Times, Canada's Wonderland and the St. George U of T campus.

Demographics

Noted alumni
 Roberta Bondar: neurologist and astronaut, first Canadian woman in space
 Dionne Brand: poet, novelist and community activist
 Claire Carver-Dias: Olympic synchronized swimmer, writer
Alicia Brown: two-time Olympian (track)
 Bruce Dowbiggin: journalist
André Dae Kim, actor, Degrassi: The Next Generation, Vampire Academy (TV series)
 Vikas Kohli: musician and music producer
 Richie Mehta: film director and writer
 John Roberts: journalist
 Wali Shah: singer-songwriter, educational speaker
 Zaib Shaikh: actor, writer and director
 Sven Spengemann: politician, current Member of Parliament for Mississauga—Lakeshore
 Belinda Karahalios: Member of Provincial Parliament for Cambridge, Ontario.
 Chris Pavlovski: CEO and founder of Rumble.

References

Further reading 
 Percy, John, and Sabeen Abbas (eds.). Celebrating 40 Years of History at the University of Toronto Mississauga. Toronto: University of Toronto Mississauga, 2007.

External links

University of Toronto
Buildings and structures in Mississauga
Brutalist architecture in Canada
Educational institutions established in 1967
Education in Mississauga
Tourist attractions in Mississauga
1967 establishments in Ontario